Negros Occidental's 5th congressional district is one of the six congressional districts of the Philippines in the province of Negros Occidental. It has been represented in the House of Representatives since 1987. The district consists of the area in south-central Negros Occidental containing the city of Himamaylan and adjacent municipalities of Binalbagan, Hinigaran, Isabela, La Castellana and Moises Padilla. It is currently represented in the 19th Congress by Dino Yulo, who is an independent.

Representation history

Election results

2022

2019

2016

2013

2010

See also
Legislative districts of Negros Occidental

References

Congressional districts of the Philippines
Politics of Negros Occidental
1987 establishments in the Philippines
Congressional districts of Western Visayas
Constituencies established in 1987